The term Kucinich resolution may refer to the following legislative proposals by Dennis Kucinich (D), representative for :

 HR 333 for the Impeachment of Dick Cheney proposed in 2007
 A set of articles for the impeachment of U.S president George Walker Bush proposed in 2008
 HR 2990 aka the National Emergency Employment Defense Act (NEED Act), a monetary reform proposal submitted in 2011

Dennis Kucinich